"Rain Song" is a song by Taiji, released on December 14, 2000. The CD was released with a 96-page photo book containing both promotional and live pictures of Taiji, titled Photograph.

Both songs were written by Taiji in memory of his former bandmate hide (X Japan).

Track listing
Music and lyrics by Taiji,

"Rain Song" - 06:43
"Dear Friend" (instrumental) - 05:55

Personnel
 Taiji - vocals, guitar, bass
 A-Joe - drums on track 1
 Yazz - backing chorus on track 1
 Okabe Toshihiko - string arrangement on track 2
 Engineered by Suguro Aoki

2000 songs